Chantal Ouoba (born 2 September 1975) is a Burkinabé athlete. She competed in the women's triple jump at the 1996 Summer Olympics.

References

External links
 

1975 births
Living people
Athletes (track and field) at the 1996 Summer Olympics
Burkinabé female triple jumpers
Olympic athletes of Burkina Faso
Place of birth missing (living people)
21st-century Burkinabé people